Julio Iricibar Bayarri (born 24 October 1993) is a Spanish footballer who plays as a goalkeeper for Zamora CF.

Football career
Born in Valladolid, Castile and León, Iricibar graduated with Real Valladolid's youth ranks. He made his senior debuts with the reserves in the 2012–13 campaign, in Tercera División.

Iricibar played his first match as a professional on 7 September 2014, replacing field player Omar Ramos in the 76th minute of a 3–1 home win against Racing de Santander in the Segunda División. Always a third-choice, his spell was mainly limited to B-team appearances until his departure in 2016.

On 7 March 2017, after eight months without a club, Iricibar signed for CD Ciudad de Lucena in the regional leagues. On 16 May, he returned to the third division after agreeing to a contract with CD Izarra.

References

External links

1993 births
Living people
Footballers from Valladolid
Spanish footballers
Footballers from Castile and León
Association football goalkeepers
Segunda División players
Segunda División B players
Primera Federación players
Tercera División players
Real Valladolid Promesas players
Real Valladolid players
CD Ciudad de Lucena players
CD Izarra footballers
UCAM Murcia CF players
CD Calahorra players